Cecil Henry Rolt was an Anglican clergyman in the first half of the 20th century.

He was born into an ecclesiastical family in 1865 and educated at Winchester and New College, Oxford. Ordained in 1888, he  held curacies at  St Thomas’s Sunderland, Christ Church West Hartlepool, St Hilda’s South Shields and St Cuthbert’s Bensham before becoming Vicar of Holy Trinity Church, Darlington. He later held further incumbencies in Batley and Huddersfield  before his appointment as  Dean of Cape Town. He died on 14 September 1926

Notes

1865 births
People educated at Winchester College
Alumni of New College, Oxford
Deans of Cape Town
1926 deaths